Steve Kozari (born June 20, 1973) is a National Hockey League referee, who wears uniform number 40. He was born in 1973 in Penticton, British Columbia. Then graduated from Penticton High School in 1991. He has been a member of the NHL Officials Association since the 2003–04 NHL season. He was one of the referees selected to officiate the 2014 Stanley Cup Finals and the 2019 Stanley Cup Finals. Steve Kozari and Kelly Sutherland were to officiate the game 7 of the 2019 Stanley Cup Finals between the St. Louis Blues and the Boston Bruins. However, due to controversy surrounding the officiating in game 5 of the same series, the NHL opted to name Gord Dwyer and Chris Rooney as the officials for game 7.

References

1973 births
Ice hockey people from British Columbia
Living people
National Hockey League officials
Canadian ice hockey officials
Sportspeople from Penticton